Catherine Verona Gordon (born 21 November 1984), known professionally as Verona Rose, is an English actress, comedian, television presenter and writer. She is known for writing and starring in various comedy series and for presenting the dating series Secret Crush on ITV2. She is also a regular fixture on British panel shows and was a contestant on the E4 series The Real Dirty Dancing in 2022.

Life and career
Rose was born Catherine Verona Gordon on 21 November 1984 in Southampton, Hampshire. She studied theatre at the BRIT School and then at Brunel University before returning to her old secondary school in Southampton to cover drama. She made her acting debut in the 2010 online web series Pini as Olive, and the following year, Rose appeared in an episode of Doctors as Alexandria. Over the next few years of her career, Rose portrayed minor roles and appeared as an extra in various television series and short films including Hustle and EastEnders. In 2019, she co-wrote and starred in the web series Dick in Ibiza and Fully Blown alongside Donna Preston, and the pair also appeared on the Channel 4 series Pants on Fire together. She also starred in the series Infatuation - Island of Love. In 2020, Rose played various characters in sketch scenes for The Emily Atack Show and also appeared as a guest on Hey Tracey!.

In 2021, Rose began presenting the dating series Secret Crush on ITV2. She also appeared as various characters  in the CBBC series Horrible Histories. In 2022, Rose competed as a contestant on the E4 reality series The Real Dirty Dancing and began appearing regularly on the comedy series Dating No Filter. She also portrayed Mogs in the Dave series Sneakerhead and appeared as Naomi in the fourth series of Netflix crime drama Top Boy. Rose also made guest appearances on Celebrity Juice and CelebAbility and is also set to appear in the film Finding Forever. In June 2022, Rose appeared on an episode of Pointless Celebrities alongside Bobby Seagull. They won the jackpot and Rose donated her money to the British Thyroid Foundation.

Filmography

References

External links 
 

21st-century English actresses
21st-century English comedians
Actresses from Southampton
Black British actresses
English film actresses
English people of Nigerian descent
English television actresses
English television presenters
English women comedians
English writers
Living people
1984 births